Andy Ristie (born March 17, 1982) is a Surinamese-Dutch kickboxer who competes in the lightweight division. After an unremarkable beginning to his career, he came to prominence with a lengthy and entertaining winning streak in the It's Showtime promotion in 2011 and 2012. This earned him an invite to fight amongst the 70 kg/154 lb division's elite, competing in the K-1 World MAX 2012 Tournament and debuting in Glory shortly after.

He utilizes devastating knee strikes to the body and possesses considerable punching power, especially in his left hook. As of 2 November 2015, he is ranked the No. 2 lightweight in the world by GLORY.

Career

Early career (2002–2011)
Ristie was born in Paramaribo, Suriname in 1982 and relocated to Amsterdam, Netherlands where he was trained by Lucien Carbin at Fight Club Carbin. He began training Muay Thai around age of 20 and while he won the World Kickboxing Network (WKN) Intercontinental Super Welterweight (-72.6/160.1 lb) Championship as an amateur, the beginnings of his professional career were fought in relative obscurity. Having built up an extensive record with an impressive knockout ratio fighting in smaller events in Suriname and the Netherlands, he was recruited by the It's Showtime promotion at twenty-nine years of age. He debuted with a first-round KO of Nick Beljaards at BFN Group presents: It's Showtime Brussels in Brussels, Belgium on March 26, 2011.

On September 25, 2011, Ristie defeated William Diender via unanimous decision in the tournament reserve bout of the BFN Group & Music Hall presents: It's Showtime "Fast & Furious 70MAX" in Brussels. He followed this up with a technical knockout defeat of Jonay Risco at Street Culture, Fight Club Group & Canary Kickboxing Federation presents: It's Showtime 53 on November 12, 2011, in Tenerife, Spain. Having dominated Risco throughout the fight, Ristie floored the Spaniard with a left hook in round three and, while he was able to make it back to his feet, referee Joop Ubeda called a halt to the contest.

2012–present
He stopped Hinata Watanabe in the first round of their contest at It's Showtime 2012 in Leeuwarden in Leeuwarden, Netherlands, on January 28, 2012. After dropping his opponent in ten seconds, he sent Hinata to the canvas twice more, forcing a referee stoppage. This win helped establish Ristie as a force on the world stage and earned him a contract with K-1. He was invited to compete alongside fifteen of the world's other top 70 kg/154 lb kickfighters in the K-1 World MAX 2012 World Championship Tournament, and faced Gago Drago in the opening stage at the K-1 World MAX 2012 World Championship Tournament Final 16 in Madrid, Spain on May 27, 2012. He began the fight by battering Drago with knees to the head and body and continued to put a one-sided beating on the Armenian throughout, winning a wide unanimous decision.

On June 30, 2012, he KO'd Samir Djabba with a left hook in the first round, after 32 seconds, Music Hall & BFN Group present: It's Showtime 57 & 58 in Brussels. Then, in his third fight in as many months, he stopped David Calvo with a knee to the body in under a minute at Street Culture, Federación Canaria de Kickboxing & Fightclub Group present: It's Showtime 59 in Tenerife on July 21, 2012. He had originally been set to face Abraham Roqueñi at the event but he withdrew due to injury a week before. After these victories, he broke the top ten in the world rankings for the first time in June 2012, coming in at No. 8.

He was expected to fight on an It's Showtime card in Yokohama, Japan, on November 17, 2012, but the event was cancelled following the promotion's acquisition by Glory and so he was transferred to Glory 2: Brussels in Belgium and put up against Nordin Benmoh. Once again, he stopped his opponent with a left hook. A rematch between Ristie and Hinata Watanabe was booked as the reserve fight for the Shoot Boxing World Tournament 2012 in Tokyo, Japan on November 17, 2012, and ended like the pair's first match ten months earlier: Hinata was cut early on and dropped with punches twice shortly after, resulting in a referee stoppage and a first-round technical knockout win for Ristie.

Ristie was drawn against Andy Souwer in the quarter-finals of the K-1 World MAX 2012 World Championship Tournament Final in Athens, Greece on December 15, 2013, but lost after a unanimous decision. Despite ending the year with a loss, he went 6–1 over the course of the twelve months, breaking into the top ten.

For his first match in 2013, Ristie was set to face four-time world champion and original K-1 World MAX winner Albert Kraus at Glory 5: London in London, England on March 23 but was unable to fight due to visa issues and was replaced by Warren Stevelmans. He was then transferred onto the Glory 6: Istanbul card in Istanbul on April 6 to face Alessandro Campagna.

The Kraus-Ristie fight was rescheduled for Glory 8: Tokyo - 2013 65kg Slam on May 3, 2013, and he won with a knee KO in round two.

He was to fight Sanny Dahlbeck at Glory 10: Los Angeles - Middleweight World Championship Tournament in Ontario, California on September 28, 2013. However, the Swede withdrew for undisclosed reasons and was replaced by Niclas Larsen. He defeated Larsen via unanimous decision.

Ristie caused one of the biggest upsets in kickboxing history when he knocked out both Giorgio Petrosyan and Robin van Roosmalen to win the Glory 12: New York - Lightweight World Championship Tournament in New York City, New York, US on November 23, 2013. Against Giorgio Petrosyan in the semi-finals, Ristie applied a lot of pressure and caused the Italian problems in finding his rhythm, but Petrosyan controlled the first two rounds nonetheless. Going into the third in need of a knockout, Ristie managed just that when he landed a huge right hand that had Petrosyan stunned only for him to follow it up with a combination of a right, left and another left that finished it, becoming the first man to stop Petrosyan and ending his forty-two fight, six year undefeated streak. Riding the wave of momentum that saw him dethrone kickboxing's all-time greatest, Ristie continued his rich vein of form in the final against Robin van Roosmalen, dropping the Dutchman towards the tail end of round one before putting him away in two. Ristie had some problems with his camp in the weeks prior to the tournament, leaving his longtime trainer Lucien Carbin to form his own Team Ristie.

He was to fight for the inaugural Glory Lightweight Championship against Ky Hollenbeck at Glory 14: Zagreb in Zagreb, Croatia on March 8, 2014 but Hollenbeck withdrew and was replaced by Davit Kiria. He dominated the Georgian for the first three rounds and scored a knockdown with a step knee in the second, but faded in the championship rounds and was stopped in the fifth.

The Hollenbeck-Ristie fight was then scheduled for Glory 17: Los Angeles in Inglewood, California, US on June 21, 2014. Andy Ristie knocked out Ky Hollenbeck thirty-five seconds into round one, stunning his American opponent with a jab before putting him away with a left hook.

On the February 6, 2015, Ristie fought Steve Moxon in a Superfight on Glory 19: USA in Hampton, Virginia, USA. He won the fight via TKO in the first round.

Ristie fought Robin van Roosmalen for the Glory Lightweight title during Glory 20: Dubai. Roosmalen won the fight by unanimous decision.

Andy Ristie returned to kickboxing, following a four-year hiatus, to fight Kong Lingfeng during Kunlun Fight 81. The fight went into an extra round, after which Lingfeng won a decision.

Championships and awards

Kickboxing
Glory
Glory Lightweight (-70kg/154.3lb) World Championship Tournament Champion
Bloody Elbow.com
2013 Knockout of the Year vs. Giorgio Petrosyan on November 23
Liver Kick.com
2013 Knockout of the Year vs. Giorgio Petrosyan on November 23
World Kickboxing Network
WKN Amateur Intercontinental Super Welterweight (-72.6 kg/160.1 lb) Championship

Kickboxing record

|-  bgcolor="#FFBBBB"
| 2019-07-27
| Loss
|align=left| Kong Lingfeng
| |Kunlun Fight 81
| China
| Extra Round Decision
| 4
| 3:00
| 47-6-1
|-
|-  bgcolor="#FFBBBB"
| 2015-04-03 || Loss ||align=left| Robin van Roosmalen || Glory 20: Dubai || Dubai, UAE || Decision (unanimous) || 5 || 3:00 || 47-5-1
|-
! style=background:white colspan=9 |
|-
|-  bgcolor="#CCFFCC"
| 2015-02-06 || Win ||align=left| Steve Moxon || Glory 19: Virginia || Hampton, Virginia, USA || TKO (referee stoppage)|| 1 || 2:43 || 47-4-1
|-
|-  bgcolor="#CCFFCC"
| 2014-12-28 || Win ||align=left| Samuel Paiva || Star Fighters Promotion presents: "THE MACHINE IS BACK"|| Paramaribo, Suriname || TKO (punches) || 2 || || 46-4-1
|-
|-  bgcolor="#CCFFCC"
| 2014-06-21 || Win ||align=left| Ky Hollenbeck || Glory 17: Los Angeles || Inglewood, California, USA || KO (left jab and left hook) || 1 || 0:35 || 45-4-1
|-
|-  bgcolor="#FFBBBB"
| 2014-03-08 || Loss ||align=left| Davit Kiria || Glory 14: Zagreb || Zagreb, Croatia || KO (punches) || 5 || 2:22 || 44-4-1
|-
! style=background:white colspan=9 |
|-
|-  bgcolor="#CCFFCC"
| 2013-11-23 || Win ||align=left| Robin van Roosmalen || Glory 12: New York- Lightweight World Championship Tournament, Final || New York City, New York, USA || KO (left uppercut) || 2 || 1:45 || 44-3-1
|-
! style=background:white colspan=9 |
|-
|-  bgcolor="#CCFFCC"
| 2013-11-23 || Win ||align=left| Giorgio Petrosyan || Glory 12: New York – Lightweight World Championship Tournament, Semi Finals || New York City, New York, USA || KO (left uppercut) || 3 || 0:43 || 43-3-1
|-
|-  bgcolor="#CCFFCC"
| 2013-09-28 || Win ||align=left| Niclas Larsen || Glory 10: Los Angeles || Ontario, California, USA || Decision (unanimous) || 3 || 3:00 || 42-3-1
|
|-
|-  bgcolor="CCFFCC"
| 2013-05-03 || Win ||align=left| Albert Kraus || Glory 8: Tokyo || Tokyo, Japan || KO (knee) || 2 || || 41-3-1
|-
|-  bgcolor="CCFFCC"
| 2013-04-06 || Win ||align=left| Alessandro Campagna || Glory 6: Istanbul || Istanbul, Turkey || Decision (unanimous) || 3 || 3:00 || 40-3-1 
|-
|-  bgcolor="#FFBBBB"
| 2012-12-15 || Loss ||align=left| Andy Souwer || K-1 World MAX 2012 World Championship Tournament Final, Quarter Finals || Athens, Greece || Decision (unanimous) || 3 || 3:00 || 39-3-1
|-
|-  bgcolor="CCFFCC"
| 2012-11-17 || Win ||align=left| Hinata Watanabe || Shoot Boxing World Tournament 2012, Reserve Bout || Tokyo, Japan || TKO (referee stoppage) || 1 || 2:31 || 39-2-1
|-
|-  bgcolor="CCFFCC"
| 2012-10-06 || Win ||align=left| Nordin Benmoh || Glory 2: Brussels || Brussels, Belgium || KO (left hook) || 1 || 2:20 || 38-2-1
|-
|-  bgcolor="CCFFCC"
| 2012-07-21 || Win ||align=left| David Calvo || Street Culture, Federación Canaria de Kickboxing & Fightclub Group present: It's Showtime 59 || Tenerife, Spain || KO (right knee to the body) || 1 || 0:45 || 37-2-1
|-
|-  bgcolor="CCFFCC"
| 2012-06-30 || Win ||align=left| Samir Djabba || Music Hall & BFN Group present: It's Showtime 57 & 58 || Brussels, Belgium || KO (left hook) || 1 || 0:32 || 36-2-1
|-
|-  bgcolor="CCFFCC"
| 2012-05-27 || Win ||align=left| Gago Drago || K-1 World MAX 2012 World Championship Tournament Final 16, First Round || Madrid, Spain || Decision (unanimous) || 3 || 3:00 || 35-2-1
|-
|-  bgcolor="CCFFCC"
| 2012-01-28 || Win ||align=left| Hinata Watanabe || It's Showtime 2012 in Leeuwarden || Leeuwarden, Netherlands || TKO (referee stoppage) || 1 || 1:58 || 34-2-1
|-
|-  bgcolor="CCFFCC"
| 2011-11-12 || Win ||align=left| Jonay Risco || Street Culture, Fight Club Group & Canary Kickboxing Federation presents: It's Showtime 53 || Tenerife, Spain || TKO (left hook) || 3 || 2:30 || 33-2-1
|-
|-  bgcolor="CCFFCC"
| 2011-09-25 || Win ||align=left| William Diender || BFN Group & Music Hall presents: It's Showtime "Fast & Furious 70MAX", Reserve Bout || Brussels, Belgium || Decision (unanimous) || 3 || 3:00 || 32-2-1
|-
|-  bgcolor="CCFFCC"
| 2011-03-26 || Win ||align=left| Nick Beljaards || BFN Group presents: It's Showtime Brussels || Brussels, Belgium || KO || 1 || || 31-2-1
|-
|-  bgcolor="CCFFCC"
| 2010-08-29 || Win ||align=left| Henri van Opstal || Slamm: Fighting with the Stars || Paramaribo, Suriname || Decision (unanimous) || 3 || 3:00 || 30-2-1
|-
|-  bgcolor="#FFBBBB"
| 2009-08-08 || Loss||align=left| Leroy Kaestner || SLAMM!! Soema Na Basi IV || Paramaribo, Suriname ||Decision (unanimous) || 3 || 3:00 || 29-2-1
|-
|-  bgcolor="#FFBBBB"
| 2009-06-08 || Loss ||align=left| Ramzi Tamaditi || Victory or Hell || Volendam, Netherlands || Decision (unanimous) || 5 || 3:00 || 29-1-1
|-
|-  bgcolor="CCFFCC"
| 2008-00-00 || Win ||align=left| Hermanus Wouters || Anthony Nesty Sporthal|| Paramaribo, Suriname || KO (left hook) || 1 || || 29-0-1
|-
|-  bgcolor="CCFFCC"
| 2007-00-00 || Win ||align=left| Hicham Boukhari || The Night of Honor || Suriname || KO (left cross) || 1 || 0:19 || 28-0-1
|-
|-
| colspan=9 | Legend:

External links
 Official Glory profile
 Official K-1 profile

References

1982 births
Living people
Dutch male kickboxers
Surinamese male kickboxers
Lightweight kickboxers
Middleweight kickboxers
Dutch Muay Thai practitioners
Surinamese Muay Thai practitioners
Sportspeople from Paramaribo
Surinamese emigrants to the Netherlands
Glory kickboxers
Kunlun Fight kickboxers